Duke Bojadziev (born 24 September 1972) is a Macedonian composer, record producer and pianist, who lives in New York City.

Biography
Duke Bojadziev showed interest in music at a young age. He played piano from the age of three and first composed when he was ten years old. Taking after his father, who balanced successful careers in both music and medicine, Duke earned his medical degree and then moved in Boston, to attend Berklee College of Music. Upon graduating in 2001, he moved to New York City.

Duke Bojadziev worked as producer and composer for oscar-winning film directors Jonathan Demme and Danis Tanovic, as well as oscar-nominee Stole Popov on his last movie To the Hilt. From 2005 he was two and a half years music director and pianist for The Citizens Band. He worked on global advertising campaigns for Peugeot, Mercedes, L’Oréal, Lancôme and Anna Sui.  Duke Bojadziev has produced remixes for Cyndi Lauper and the Blue Man Group, and honed his inventive style through performances with various ensembles at NYC’s Carnegie Hall, Highline Ballroom, Cipriani Ballroom, The Box,  Drom NYC, Art Basel in Miami, The Avalon Theater in Los Angeles and Ohrid’s Summer Festival.

Duke starts with concerts in 2011, in collaboration with Macedonian Filcharmonic Orchestra, Tanja Carovska, Karolina Gočeva and other names of music world. On 8 October 2015 in Carnegie Hall he has concert with Chamber Orchestra.

Duke has released seven albums, and had his music featured on world-renowned CD compilations as Buddha Bar XIV, Chill Out In Paris, and Marrakech Express. On 8 November 2022, it was announced through a press release by Avalon Production, that an album titled Pesni za Ljubov i Kopnež, which is a collaborative project by Bojadziev, Karolina Gočeva and Ismail Lumanovski would be promoted through a concert at the Macedonian Philharmonic on 23 December 2022. The following day, the album is expected to be released through all digital platforms in North Macedonia.

Experience

Film
 Do Balchak - by Stole Popov
 The Secret Life of Walter Mitty - Ben Stiller
 Fear of falling - by Jonathan Demme
 Dreaming American - by Lee Percy
 The War is over - by Mitko Panov
 Wingless – by Ivo Trajkov
 The Ten – by Ken Marino and David Wain
 Shadows – by Milcho Manchevski
 Hell – by Danis Tanovic
 Suffering Man's Charity – by Alan Cumming
 Shortcut to Nirvana – by Nick Day
 Sweetbreads (short) – by Noora Niskanen
 Nuts (short) – by Andre Lyon

TV
 Martha Stewart
 Moment of Luxury
 Guiding Light

Advertising 
Duke Bojadziev worked on global advertising campaigns for: Mercedes, Chrysler, L’ancome, L’oreal, Maybelline, Anna Sui, Cuervo, Crest, Peugeot, Verizon.

Multimedia and web 
 FontaineBleau Hotels
 Vera Wang
 GE
 W hotels
 Vanity Fair
 Cosmopolitan

Discography
 New York a.m.
 The War is Over (soundtrack)
 Love is The Way
 Stream of Consciousness (solo piano)
 Digital Confessions 2
 Digital Confessions
 Esma's Dream
 Pesni za Ljubov i Kopnež (2022)

CD compilations
 Buddha Bar XIV
 Chill Out in Paris 4, 5 & 7
 Airfrance
 Fashion Week 5 
 Marrakech Express 2 
 Diesel_U_Music 
 Styled in Italy 
 Papeete Beach Lounge 
 La Suite 6 
 Ram Cafe 4 
 KU DE TA 4

References

External links
 Official website
 Official YouTube channel

1972 births
Living people
Musicians from Skopje
Macedonian composers
Male composers
Macedonian pianists
Musicians from New York City
21st-century pianists
21st-century male musicians